Sven Adolf Hack d'Ailly (January 1, 1892 in Stockholm – August 14, 1969 in Täby), was a Swedish baritone, lute player, director, actor, and grandmaster of Par Bricole.

Filmography 

 1919: Sons of Ingmar
 1942: Doctor Glas
 1944: My People Are Not Yours
 1947: The Girl from the Marsh Croft
 1961: Rififi in Stockholm

Discography 

 Luciavalsen / Vår Vintervals
 Set Svanholm Live
 The Jussi Bjorling Series (1934-1951)
 Operan (Röster Från Stockholmsoperan Under 100 År)

References

External links 
 https://www.imdb.com/name/nm0194912/
 https://www.discogs.com/artist/6652647-Sven-dAilly

1892 births
1969 deaths
Swedish operatic baritones
Swedish lutenists
20th-century Swedish male singers